This article is about music-related events in 1876.

Events 
February – Baritone Lithgow James joins the English Opera Company, where he begins a partnership with his future wife Florence St. John.
February 24 – Incidental music composed by Edvard Grieg for Henrik Ibsen's Peer Gynt premieres.
May 17 – Antonín Dvořák begins composing his Moravian Duets.
August 16 – Richard Wagner's Siegfried debuts in the new Bayreuth Festspielhaus.
August 17 – Richard Wagner's Götterdämmerung debuts in the new Bayreuth Festspielhaus.
Soprano Rosa Hasselbeck marries the conductor and composer Josef Sucher.

Published popular music 
 "Grandfather's Clock" by Henry Clay Work
 "The Bonnie Banks o' Loch Lomond" by Andrew Lang
 "Gay As A Lark" by Septimus Winner
 "When The Great Red Dawn is Shining" (anon)
 "Old Aunt Jemima" by Billy Kersands
 "Molly Malone"
 "Rose of Killarney" by George Cooper & John Rogers Thomas

Classical music 
Johannes Brahms – Symphony No. 1
Pietro Abbà Cornaglia – Requiem
Felix Draeseke – Six Fugues for piano; Dämmerungsräume: five piano pieces, Op. 14
Antonín Dvořák – Piano Concerto in G minor, Op. 33
Gabriel Fauré – Violin Sonata No. 1 in A major, Op. 13
César Franck – Les Éolides
Benjamin Godard – Concerto Romantique
Edvard Grieg – Ballade in the Form of Variations on a Norwegian Folk Song (for piano), Op. 24
Édouard Lalo – Cello Concerto
Gustav Mahler  – Piano Quartet movement in A
Bedřich Smetana – String Quartet No. 1 in E minor, From My Life
Pyotr Ilyich Tchaikovsky – The Seasons (for piano), Op. 37a
Charles-Marie Widor – Organ Symphonies Nos. 1–3, Op. 13

Opera 
Arrigo Boito – Mefistofele
Luigi Denza – Wallenstein
Amilcare Ponchielli – La Gioconda
Bedřich Smetana – The Kiss
Richard Wagner
Siegfried
Götterdämmerung
Ivan Zajc – Nikola Šubić Zrinski

Musical theater 
Richard Genée – Der Seekadette
Robert Planquette – Les cloches de Corneville

Births 
January 12
Annie Krull, operatic soprano (died 1947)
Ermanno Wolf-Ferrari, composer (died 1948)
January 19 – Rosina Storchio, Italian lyric soprano (died 1945)
January 29
Havergal Brian, composer (died 1972)
Ludolf Nielsen, composer (died 1939)
February 2 – Giovanni Zenatello, tenor (died 1949)
February 28 – John Alden Carpenter, composer
March 11 – Carl Ruggles, composer (died 1971)
May 17 – Carrie Tubb, soprano (died 1976)
June 2 – Hakon Børresen, Danish composer (died 1954)
June 5 – Tony Jackson, jazz musician (died 1920)
August 14 – Florrie Forde, Australian-born English music hall singer (died 1940)
August 16 – Karl Hoschna, Bohemian-born US composer
September 15 – Bruno Walter, conductor (died 1962)
November 23 – Manuel de Falla, composer (died 1946)
December 11 – Mieczysław Karłowicz, composer (died 1909)
December 29
Pablo Casals, cellist (died 1973)
Lionel Tertis, violist (died 1975)

Deaths 
February 28 – Raimondo Boucheron, composer, 75
March 5
Francesco Maria Piave, librettist and friend of Giuseppe Verdi, 65
Marie d'Agoult, lover of Franz Liszt and mother of Cosima Wagner, 70
March 28 – Joseph Böhm, violinist, 80
April 19 – Samuel Sebastian Wesley, organist and composer, 65
June 28 – August Wilhelm Ambros, composer and music historian, 69
August 29 – Félicien-César David, composer, 66
September 9 – Mary Shaw, operatic contralto, 62
September 30 – Henri Bertini, pianist and composer, 77
October 1 – James Lick, American carpenter and piano builder, 80
November 8 – Antonio Tamburini, operatic baritone, 76
November 9 – Édouard Batiste, organist and composer, 56
November 18 – Nicolas Bosret, blind organist and composer, 77
December 3 – Hermann Goetz, composer, 35 (tuberculosis)
December 14 – George Frederick Anderson, violinist, 83

References 

 
19th century in music
Music by year